Tarkan Gözübüyük (born 15 July 1970) is the bass player of the Turkish heavy metal band Mezarkabul (known as Pentagram in Turkey).

Biography
Born in 1970 in Erzurum, he grew up in Bursa. His first encounter with the bass guitar was aged fourteen.

Studied jazz at the Faculty of Music of Bilkent University, in Ankara.

Before joining Mezarkabul, he performed as a Jazz bass guitarist and played in his high-school's main orchestra. He performed on stage with Mezarkabul during most of their concerts except their debut concert in 1987. After joining Mezarkabul, he worked on several other projects as a producer. As a producer, he contributed to the albums of famous Turkish rock artists like Şebnem Ferah, Özlem Tekin, Teoman, Demir Demirkan, Ogün Sanlısoy (the former vocalist of Mezarkabul) and bands like Knight Errant, Kül, Mor ve Ötesi and Athena (band). Other than rock music, he also contributed to the debut album of the sister of the famous Turkish rapper Ceza, Ayben.

He has been a member of Mezarkabul since 1987, with whom he has released six albums, and he is also well known as a music producer in Turkey. His authentic way of playing is admired by many bass guitarists as he combines classic Power metal rhythm with Middle-Eastern rhythm.

References
 Mezarkabul Official Webpage

Turkish heavy metal bass guitarists
Turkish rock guitarists
Living people
1970 births
21st-century bass guitarists